The 2019 Team Speedway Junior World Championship was the 15th FIM Team Under-21 World Championship season. The final took place on 12 July 2019 at the National Speedway Stadium in Manchester, England.

Poland won their 12th Team Under-21 World Championship, and their sixth in succession.

Final 
  Manchester
 12 July 2019

Scores

See also 
 2019 Speedway of Nations
 2019 Individual Speedway Junior World Championship

References 

2019
World Team Junior
Team Speedway
International sports competitions in Manchester